On 7 June 1978, the Chilean Oil tanker Cabo Tamar ran aground at San Vicente Bay, near Talcahuano, Chile, and released 12,000 tons of oil (of the 64,000 ton load).

See also
 VLCC Metula oil spill, biggest oil spill in Chile
 Guamblin Island, second biggest oil spill in Chile

References

Oil spills in Chile
Environment of Chile
1978 in the environment
1978 in Chile
History of Biobío Region
June 1978 events in South America